The 2011–12 Top League Challenge Series was the 2011–12 edition of the Top League Challenge Series, a second-tier rugby union competition in Japan, in which teams from regionalised leagues competed for promotion to the Top League for the 2012–13 season. The competition was contested from 25 December 2011 to 11 February 2012.

Canon Eagles and Kyuden Voltex won promotion to the 2012–13 Top League, while Kubota Spears and Toyota Industries Shuttles progressed to the promotion play-offs.

Competition rules and information

The top two teams from the regional Top East League, Top West League and Top Kyūshū League qualified to the Top League Challenge Series. The regional league winners participated in Challenge 1, while the runners-up participated in Challenge 2. The winner of Challenge 2 also progressed to a four-team Challenge 1.

The top two teams in Challenge 1 won automatic promotion to the 2012–13 Top League, while the third and fourth-placed teams qualified to the promotion play-offs.

Qualification

The teams qualified to the Challenge 1 and Challenge 2 series through the 2011 regional leagues.

Top West League

The final standings for the 2011 Top West League were:

 Toyota Industries Shuttles qualified for Challenge 1.
 Chubu Electric Power qualified for Challenge 2.

Top East League

The final standings for the 2011 Top East League were:

 Canon Eagles qualified for Challenge 1.
 Kubota Spears qualified for Challenge 2.

Top Kyūshū League

The final standings for the 2011 Top Kyūshū League were:

 JR Kyūshū Thunders, Kyuden Voltex and Mazda Blue Zoomers qualified to the Second Phase.
 Mitsubishi Heavy Industries and Mitsubishi Mizushima were relegated to lower leagues.

 Kyuden Voltex qualified for Challenge 1.
 JR Kyūshū Thunders qualified for Challenge 2.

Challenge 1

Standings

The final standings for the 2011–12 Top League Challenge 1 were:

 Canon Eagles and Kyuden Voltex won promotion to the 2012–13 Top League.
 Kubota Spears and Toyota Industries Shuttles progressed to the promotion play-offs.

Matches

The following matches were played in the 2011–12 Top League Challenge 1:

Challenge 2

Standings

The final standings for the 2011–12 Top League Challenge 2 were:

 Kubota Spears progressed to Challenge 1.

Matches

The following matches were played in the 2011–12 Top League Challenge 2:

See also

 2011–12 Top League
 Top League Challenge Series

References

2011-12 Challenge
2011–12 in Japanese rugby union
2011–12 rugby union tournaments for clubs